The Exercise Franchise For Good Governance (EFG) is an Indian civil society organization formed in 2007, that aims to encourage participation in elections. It believes that rise in citizen's participation strengthens political accountability. An accountable political system helps shape governance both from the perspective of Electors as well as Politicians. The founding members of the group are Dr Satbir Silas, Uttam Prakash, Sanjay Chadha, Ratan Lal,G Venkatesh, Yogendra Jha, U G Sujatha, Hemang P Jani.

EFG launched voter awareness campaign during the 2008 assembly elections in Delhi and the 2009 General Elections in India. It made two strategic interventions. The first was through its website where it disseminated information about candidates contesting elections. It opened a section called “EFG book of Commitment”, encouraging netizens to sign a commitment as a token self-promise to vote.

The second intervention was through a “people to people contact” programme. Between March and May 2009, two campaigns namely “Respect Your Vote” and “Jog for Democracy” were organised.

“Respect Your Vote” was a nationwide campaign that reached out to citizens face-to-face. As a road show, it toured cities asking for people's commitment to vote through a formal signature. The signatures were taken on a Flex Board that read "Respect Your Vote and the Votes would Respect Your Aspirations". The idea was to bring in self-discipline for the target groups, mainly the educated youth and the middle class that shies away from voting. It covered the cities of Madurai, Chennai, Agra, Delhi, Ahmedabad and Kolkata. The programme found friends in local NGOs like Lions Clubs International, Agra Vikas Manch that supported and participated in the road show.

“Jog For Democracy” was launched at the elite Lodhi Gardens in Delhi on April 11, 2009.  At the event, EFG volunteers from different backgrounds such as students, professors, corporate professionals, new tax payers, senior citizens and young women participated in good numbers. Wearing EFG T-shirts displaying messages that good governance begins with casting of a vote,  fellow joggers were requested to commit to vote through a formal signature. The signatures were taken on a board that read “Respect Your Vote and the votes would respect your Aspirations”. There after the programme moved from one local park to another in colonies of Delhi culminating into a candlelit march at Jantar Mantar a day before Delhi went to polls.

EFG has been demanding inclusion  "Do you have a Voters id Card?" on appeal applications under RTI. The idea is to distribute voter registration forms to such applicants who say "NO",  as these are enlightened citizens who should also lead governance reforms through exercising franchise.

EFG is launching a new awareness campaign for 2014 general elections in India under the theme Promise2Vote

EFG has a Facebook page : www.facebook.com/promise2vote

EFG in the Media
Some of the media that gave space to EFG include BBC,The National, The Times of IndiaThe Times, Gulf Times, Khaleej Times, The News Today (Dhaka)The Hindu,  The Indian Express, The Hindustan Times,The New Indian Express, DNA, The Statesman,Mail Today , India Today, World Movement for Democracy. Amongst the vernacular press were Hindustan, Punjab Kesri, Nai Dunia, Virat Baibhav, Dainik Jagran, Dinakaran, Dinamalar, Mahasamar, Amar Ujala, Samar Bhumi, Desh Bandhu, Bharat Agra Samachar and a host of online media. Amongst the electronic media notable were DD, X news, Aaj Tak, NDTV, Zee news, All India Radio etc.

Other Programmes of EFG
“Bal Panchayat” amongst slum children in Delhi where attempt is made to instill confidence in them about ownership of governance that does not discriminate on economic front.

EFG's website has a page called “ EFG's Book of Commitment”. One can sign a unique virtual commitment to self as a token gesture to take all efforts to participate in elections. The idea is to do the least towards improving political accountability. One of EFG's slogans towards this goal is “Drawing Room Complaints are not heard, but Votes are”

Any common man who feels that participation in elections can help strengthen the quality of governance is a potential ambassador of EFG.

Shrey Goyal, Asia Regional winner of an essay contest organised by World Youth Movement of Democracy, refers to EFG in the winning essay.

References

http://www.expressindia.com/latest-news/now-freshers-can-swear-to-vote-as-they-enter-university/468651/ 

http://www.thenational.ae/article/20090507/FOREIGN/705069884/1140
Hindustan Times
http://news.gaeatimes.com/53-percent-of-delhi-votes-congress-exudes-confidence-54962/
https://web.archive.org/web/20090509202510/http://www.sindhtoday.net/south-asia/94260.htm
http://www.thaindian.com/newsportal/politics/53-percent-of-delhi-votes-congress-exudes-confidence-delhi-roundup_100189675.html 
http://news.webindia123.com/news/Articles/India/20090507/1248397.html
http://www.aol.in/news-story/53-percent-of-delhi-votes-congress-exudes-confidence/2009050712139012000034
http://www.jansamachar.net/pof.php3?num=39508&lang=English
http://www.newkerala.com/nkfullnews-1-34486.html
https://archive.today/20130131025716/http://www.parinda.com/news/politics/20090507/23205/53-percent-delhi-votes-congress-exudes-confidence
http://news.bbc.co.uk/go/pr/fr/-/2/hi/south_asia/7749635.stm
http://www.indianexpress.com/news/Young-voters-a-deciding-factor/396064
http://www.screenindia.com/news/young-voters-a-deciding-factor/396064/
http://indiatoday.intoday.in/index.php?option=com_content&task=view&id=24293&sectionid=81&Itemid=1&issueid=90

https://web.archive.org/web/20090412052132/http://www.exchange4media.com/e4m/news/fullstory.asp?section_id=8&news_id=34375&tag=29461

http://epaper.indianexpress.com/IE/IEH/2009/04/15/ArticleHtmls/15_04_2009_503_014.shtml?Mode=1
Hindustan Times
https://web.archive.org/web/20110711133419/http://www.gulftimes.com/site/topics/printArticle.aspcu_no%3D2%26item_no%3D288237%26version%3D1%26template_id%3D46%26parent_id%3D26

https://web.archive.org/web/20120927173626/http://www.khaleejtimes.com/DisplayArticle.aspxfile%3Ddata/specialfeature/2009/April/specialfeature_April112.xml%26section%3Dspecialfeature%26col%3D
http://www.timesonline.co.uk/tol/news/world/asia/article6115787.ece
http://epaper.mailtoday.in/352009/epaperpdf/352009-md-hr-23.pdf

External links
Official site

 Promise2Vote

Elections in India
2007 establishments in India
Voter turnout organizations